Daniel Edward Thomas (born June 11, 1959) is an American prelate of the Roman Catholic Church. Since 2014, he has served as the eighth bishop of the Diocese of Toledo in Ohio.  Thomas previously served as an auxiliary bishop of the Archdiocese of Philadelphia in Pennsylvania from 2006 to 2014.

Biography

Early life 
Daniel Thomas was born on June 11, 1959, in the Manayunk section of Philadelphia, Pennsylvania, to Francis and Anna (née Weber) Thomas. He graduated from Roman Catholic High School in Philadelphia in 1977, and then attended St. Charles Borromeo Seminary in Wynnewood, Pennsylvania.

Priesthood 
Thomas was ordained to the priesthood for the Archdiocese of Philadelphia by Cardinal John Krol on May 18, 1985.  His first assignment after ordination was as parochial vicar of Saint Joseph's Parish in Aston, Pennsylvania.  In 1987, Thomas started graduate studies in dogmatic theology at the Pontifical North American College in Rome, earning his Licentiate of Sacred Theology from the Pontifical Gregorian University in 1989. 

Thomas was an official of the Congregation for Bishops in the Roman Curia from 1990 to 2005, while also serving as spiritual director to the seminarians of the North American College. After returning to Philadelphia, Thomas became pastor of Our Lady of the Assumption Parish in Strafford, Pennsylvania on November 19, 2005. He was raised to the rank of honorary prelate by the Vatican that same year.

Auxiliary Bishop of Philadelphia

On June 8, 2006, Thomas was appointed as an auxiliary bishop of the Archdiocese of Philadelphia and titular bishop of Bardstown by Pope Benedict XVI. He received his episcopal consecration on July 26, 2006, from Cardinal Justin Rigali, with Archbishops John Foley and Edwin O'Brien serving as co-consecrators, in the Cathedral-Basilica of Sts. Peter and Paul in Philadelphia. Thomas adopted as his episcopal motto: Dominus Meus Et Deus Meus ('My Lord and my God') from John 20:28.

Thomas headed the Secretariat of Clergy in the archdiocesan curia, and oversaw  St. Charles Borromeo Seminary and the archdiocese's Vocation Office, the Office for Communications and its newspaper, The Catholic Standard and Times.

Bishop of Toledo
Pope Francis named Thomas as bishop of the Diocese of Toledo on August 26, 2014. He was installed on October 22, 2014. He replaced Bishop Leonard Blair, who became the archbishop of the Archdiocese of Hartford in December 2013. Pope Francis named Thomas as apostolic administrator of the Diocese of Cleveland on December 28, 2016. He served this additional assignment until Bishop Nelson Perez was installed on September 5, 2017.

In 2018, Thomas reflected on his handling of a sexual abuse allegation as auxiliary bishop in Philadelphia.  The incident had been reported in a 2011 grand jury investigation of sexual abuse in the Archdiocese of Philadelphia.  In 2007, a man known as "Ben" reported to the archdiocese that he had been sexually abused when he was a child by Joseph J. Gallagher, a priest in archdiocese.  Gallagher was already the focus of similar allegations.  However, the archdiocese review board found Ben's allegations to be unsubstantiated.  Thomas approved the findings and sent them to the archbishop.  Less than a year later, Ben committed suicide.   Thomas had this comment:In hindsight, perhaps I would have asked if there was more information we could determine and make a final determination on... Well I think that I feel guilty not just for myself but for any Bishop and priest who has in any way learned and known of any abuse taking place. On August 20, 2020, Thomas announced that Michael Zacharias, a priest at St. Peter's Parish in Mansfield, Ohio, had been arrested by the FBI on sexual abuse charges. On hearing the news of Zacharias' arrest, Thomas immediately suspended him from all priestly functions.On June 24, 2022, Thomas released a statement supporting the verdict in the Dobbs v. Jackson Women's Health Organization which overturned Roe v. Wade, greatly limiting abortion access for women in the United States. This historic moment moves us a step closer to establishing a culture of life where every life is valued, where the dignity of every person born and pre-born is respected, and where each human person is treasured as created in the image and likeness of God.

See also

 Catholic Church hierarchy
 Catholic Church in the United States
 Historical list of the Catholic bishops of the United States
 List of Catholic bishops of the United States
 Lists of patriarchs, archbishops, and bishops

References

External links
Roman Catholic Diocese of Toledo Official Site
USCCB Office of Media Relations
Our Lady of the Assumption Parish
Office of the Bishop- Diocese of Toledo in America

Episcopal succession

1959 births
Living people
Clergy from Philadelphia
Roman Catholic bishops of Toledo
21st-century Roman Catholic bishops in the United States
St. Charles Borromeo Seminary alumni